The 2010 FIRS Men's B-Roller Hockey World Cup or 2010 B-World Cup was the 14th edition of the Roller Hockey B World Championship, held from 23 to 30 October, in Dornbirn, Austria. This was an Official competition organized by CIRH.

Final Classification

The three first classified are qualified to 2011 CIRH World Cup, in San Juan, Argentina.

External links
Official website of the World Cup in Dornbirn

2010 Rink Hockey Men's B World Championship
LOGO 2010 Rink Hockey Men's B World Championship
CIRH website

B
F
Rink Hockey Mens B World Championship, 2010
Dornbirn
2010 B World Championship